SipXecs is a free software enterprise communications system.  

It was initially developed by Pingtel Corporation in 2003 as a voice over IP telephony server located in Boston, MA. The server was later extended with additional collaboration capabilities as part of the SIPfoundry project. Since its extension, sipXecs now acts as a software implementation of the Session Initiation Protocol (SIP), making it a full IP-based communications system (IP PBX).

SipXecs competitors include other open-source telephony and SoftSwitch solutions such as Asterisk, FreeSWITCH, and the SIP Express Router.

History
Development of sipXecs was started in 2003 by Pingtel Corp, a Boston, MA based venture backed company. In 2004, Pingtel adopted an open-source business model and contributed the codebase to the not-for-profit organization SIPfoundry.  It has been an open source project since then.

Pingtel's assets were acquired by Bluesocket in July 2007. In August 2008 the Pingtel assets were acquired from Bluesocket by Nortel. Subsequent to the acquisition by Nortel, Nortel released the SCS500 product based on sipXecs. SCS500 was positioned as an open and software-only telephony server for the SMB market up to 500 users and received some recognition. It was later renamed SCS and positioned as an Enterprise Communications System.

Subsequent to the Nortel bankruptcy and the acquisition of the Nortel assets by Avaya, Avaya has backed away from SCS in an effort to rationalize its product portfolio post acquisition of Nortel.  The sipXecs solution continued to be used as the basis for the Avaya Live cloud based communications service.

In April 2010 the founders of SIPfoundry founded .  commercialized the sipXecs solution in close cooperation with SIPfoundry and the open-source community.

SipXecs is typically deployed by enterprises wanting to replace a traditional private branch exchange (PBX) with a software-based solution that can be produced in a cloud environment. In addition to telephony features, sipXecs offers collaboration capabilities such as enterprise instant messaging and conferencing.

Information
SipXecs is designed as a software-only, distributed cloud application.  It runs on the Linux operating system CentOS or RHEL on either virtualized or physical servers. A minimum configuration allows running all of the sipXecs components on a single server, including database, all available services, and the sipXecs management. Global clusters can be built using built-in auto-configuration capabilities from the centralized management system.

SipXecs uses MongoDB as a distributed and partition tolerant database for global transactions, includes CFEngine for orchestration of clusters and JasperReports for reporting. The management and configuration system is based on the Spring Framework. sipXecs includes FreeSWITCH as its media server and Openfire for presence and instant messaging services.

SipXecs follows standards such as Session Initiation Protocol (SIP), SRTP, Extensible Messaging and Presence Protocol (XMPP), SIP and XMPP over TLS, and several Web standards including WebRTC, WebSOCKET and Representational State Transfer (REST).

, Inc. holds the US patent on the architecture referred to as SIP Session Oriented Architecture or SSOA.

Adoption
Adoption of open-source solutions is difficult to quantify. SIPfoundry claims on its Web site that over one million users have downloaded sipXecs in small and large companies worldwide.

Amazon.com was an early adopter of sipXecs. This initial 5,000 user deployment expanded considerably in the following years.

OnRelay, a company in the UK, selected sipXecs for its fixed-mobile convergence solution sold to carriers.

Colorado State University and Cedarville University of Ohio committed to sipXecs in 2010.

Red Hat deployed a commercial version of sipXecs from  globally in 2012.

Under the SIPfoundry Higher Education Program (HEP) and as of 2014 Lafayette College, St. Mary's University, Messiah College, Colorado School of Mines, Carthage College deployed sipXecs to replace their respective PBX systems.

SipXecs is used by small and large enterprises ranging up to about 20,000 users per cluster.  SIPfoundry lists the following users on its Web site: Brevard County FL,  Dutch Police, Easter Seals, Siemens Transportation,  British Airways.

Availability
SipXecs is available for Red Hat Linux and CentOS.  It runs virtualized in different cloud environments such as the Amazon Elastic Compute Cloud, the Google Compute Engine, the HP Cloud, IBM SoftLayer, VMware vCloud and VMware ESX, OpenStack environments, and clouds from other vendors using these technologies.

Licensing and Copyright 
SIPfoundry distributes the sipXecs source code under the AGPL-3.0-or-later license.

In addition, the sipXecs solution includes many other open-source components. SIPfoundry holds Copyright on all derivative work. Contributions to sipXecs are made under a Contributor Agreement, which grants SIPfoundry shared Copyright with the original author on all contributed code.

Hardware
SipXecs supports a wide range of SIP compatible hardware, such as PSTN gateways, desk phones, softphones and mobile phone applications. A plug n'play auto-configuration capability is available for phones from currently (software release 14.04) 18 different vendors.

SIP reference implementation
The SipXecs system represents a reference implementation of the SIP standard. It was used at SIPIT interoperability events organized by the SIP Forum to test interoperability of SIP solutions from many different vendors.

See also 

 Comparison of VoIP software
List of free and open-source software packages
 List of SIP software

References

External links
 SIPfoundry official website

Collaborative software
Free VoIP software
Instant messaging
Open-source cloud applications
As a service
Software using the GNU AGPL license